Viktória Koroknai (born 2 June 1979, in Székesfehérvár) is a retired Hungarian handballer.

She represented Hungary on junior level and was part of the team that finished fourth on the Junior World Championship in 1999.

References

External links
 Viktória Koroknai profile on the team representation of Veszprém Barabás KC
 Viktória Koroknai career statistics on Worldhandball.com

1979 births
Living people
Sportspeople from Székesfehérvár
Hungarian female handball players
21st-century Hungarian women